Salzburger Straßentheater is a theatre in Salzburg, Austria.

Theatres in Salzburg
Buildings and structures in Salzburg